The 2013 Vuelta a Andalucía was the 59th edition of the Vuelta a Andalucía cycle race and was held on 17 February to 20 February 2013. The race started in San Fernando and finished in Rincón de la Victoria. The race was won by Alejandro Valverde.

General classification

References

Vuelta a Andalucia
Vuelta a Andalucía by year
2013 in Spanish sport